Miss Indonesia 2019, the 15th edition of the Miss Indonesia pageant was held on February 15, 2019, at MNC Studio, Kebon Jeruk, Jakarta, Indonesia. Miss World 2018, Vanessa Ponce of Mexico attended the awarding night. Alya Nurshabrina as Miss Indonesia 2018 from West Java crowned her successor, Princess Mikhaelia Audrey Megonondo from Jambi. She will represent Indonesia on Miss World 2019.

Judges 
Judges of Miss Indonesia 2019 Pageant 
 Liliana Tanoesoedibjo, founder and chairwoman of Miss Indonesia Organization.
 Peter F. Saerang, professional make-up and hairstylist.
 Ferry Salim, actor, entrepreneur, and ambassador of UNICEF to Indonesia.
 Maria Harfanti, Miss Indonesia 2015, 2nd-Runner-up Miss World 2015, Miss World Asia 2015.
 Natasha Mannuela, Miss Indonesia 2016, 2nd-Runner-up Miss World 2016, Miss World Asia 2016.

Result

Placements

Order Announcements

Top 15

 Maluku §
 Central Sulawesi §
 West Sulawesi §
 West Sumatra §
 North Sumatra §
 Gorontalo §
 Banten
 East Java
 Yogyakarta Special Region
 Papua
 West Kalimantan
 Jambi
 Bangka Belitung Islands
 East Nusa Tenggara
 North Sulawesi
§ Placed into the Top 15 by Fast Track

Top 7 

 Maluku
 East Java
 North Sulawesi
 Jambi
 Banten
 East Nusa Tenggara
 West Sulawesi

Fast Track Event
Fast track events held during preliminary round and the winners of Fast Track events are automatically qualified to enter the semifinal round. This year's fast track events include : Talent, Catwalk (Modeling), Sports, Nature and Beauty Fashion, Social Media, And Beauty with a Purpose.

Special Awards 
Special Awards include 3 Category :

Contestants 
Contestants of Miss Indonesia 2019 from 34 Provinces in Indonesia.

References

External links 
 Official site

2019 beauty pageants
Miss Indonesia